Andrzej Karol Wołkowski (14 February 1913 – 4 March 1995), was a Polish ice hockey player. He played for Sokół Kraków, Cracovia, Ogniwo Kraków, Gwardia Kraków, and Sparta Nowy Targ during his career. With Cracovia Wołkowski won the Polish league championship three times, in 1937, 1946, and 1947. He also played for the Polish national team at the 1936 Winter Olympics, and multiple World Championships. After his playing career he became a coach, winning the 1965 Polish league championship with Podhale Nowy Targ. He was also awarded the Knight's Cross of the Order of Polonia Restituta.

References

External links
 

1913 births
1995 deaths
Burials at Rakowicki Cemetery
Ice hockey players at the 1936 Winter Olympics
Knights of the Order of Polonia Restituta
MKS Cracovia (ice hockey) players
Olympic ice hockey players of Poland
Podhale Nowy Targ players
Polish ice hockey coaches
Polish ice hockey centres
Sportspeople from Kraków